Robert Croft Bourne (15 July 1888 – 7 August 1938) was a British rower who competed in the 1912 Summer Olympics, and a Conservative Party politician who sat in the House of Commons from 1924 to 1938.

Biography

Bourne was born at Bodington, London, the son Gilbert Charles Bourne who had rowed in the winning Oxford crews in the Boat Race of 1882 and 1883. As a child, Bourne lost the sight of one eye in a game of rounders at school. He was educated at Eton College where he won the School Sculling in 1906, and then at New College, Oxford. At Oxford, he stroked the winning Oxford boats in the Boat Race in 1909, 1910, 1911 and 1912, being president in the last two years. He also won the University Sculls in 1910 and the University Fours in 1911 and went head of the river in 1911–12. He was the strokeman of the New College eight which won the silver medal for Great Britain rowing at the 1912 Summer Olympics. He was a member of the winning crew in the Stewards' Challenge Cup at Henley Royal Regatta in 1912, 1913 and 1914.

Bourne became a barrister. In the First World War, he was commissioned as a second lieutenant in the Herefordshire Regiment. He had one hand crippled and a lung seriously injured at Suvla Bay in the Dardanelles in August 1915. As he had only one good eye, he was moved from active service to the Claims Commission. In 1920 he became J.P. for Herefordshire and in 1921 a member of the city council.

Bourne was elected Conservative Member of Parliament (MP) for Oxford at a by-election in June 1924, and served as a Deputy Speaker of the Commons from 1931.  He died in office in August 1938 aged 50, suddenly dropping dead while walking on the moors near Strontian, Argyll. At the subsequent by-election the seat was held for the Conservatives by Quintin Hogg.

Bourne married Lady Hester Margaret Cairns, daughter of Wilfred Cairns, 4th Earl Cairns, on 7 June 1917. Their children included the lawyer and civil servant Sir Wilfrid Bourne.

See also
List of Oxford University Boat Race crews

References

External links

The Rowers of Vanity Fair

1888 births
1938 deaths
Military personnel from London
People educated at Eton College
Alumni of New College, Oxford
English male rowers
British male rowers
Olympic rowers of Great Britain
Rowers at the 1912 Summer Olympics
Olympic silver medallists for Great Britain
UK MPs 1924–1929
UK MPs 1929–1931
UK MPs 1931–1935
UK MPs 1935–1945
Conservative Party (UK) MPs for English constituencies
Members of the Privy Council of the United Kingdom
Herefordshire Light Infantry officers
British Army personnel of World War I
Olympic medalists in rowing
Oxford University Boat Club rowers
British sportsperson-politicians
Medalists at the 1912 Summer Olympics